Aptesini is a tribe of ichneumon wasps in the family Ichneumonidae. There are 24 described genera.

Genera
The following genera belong to the tribe Aptesini:

 Aconias Cameron, 1904 — Palearctic, Oriental
 Aptesis Förster, 1850 — Ethiopian, Holarctic, Oriental
 Colocnema Förster, 1869 — Palearctic
 Cratocryptus Thomson, 1873 — Holarctic
 Cubocephalus Ratzeburg, 1848 — Holarctic
 Demopheles Förster, 1869 — Holarctic, Oriental
 Giraudia Förster, 1869 — Holarctic
 Javra Cameron, 1903 — Holarctic, Oriental
 Listrocryptus Brauns, 1905 — Palearctic
 Litochila Momoi, 1965 — Oriental, Palearctic
 Livipurpurata Wang & Yao, 1994 — Oriental
 Mansa Tosquinet, 1896 — Ethiopian, Oriental
 Megaplectes Förster, 1869 — Holarctic
 Notocampsis Townes, 1970a — Neotropical
 Oresbius Marshall, 1867 — Holarctic
 Oxytaenia Förster, 1869 — Nearctic, Neotropical
 Parmortha Townes, 1962 — Holarctic
 Platymystax Townes, 1970a — Ethiopian, Neotropical, Oriental
 Plectrocryptus Thomson, 1874 — Oriental, Palearctic
 Pleolophus Townes, 1962 — Holarctic
 Polytribax Förster, 1869 — Holarctic, Neotropical, Oriental
 Rhytura Townes, 1962 — Nearctic
 Schenkia Förster, 1869 — Holarctic
 Stomacis Townes, 1970a — Oriental

References

Further reading

 

Parasitic wasps
Cryptinae
Hymenoptera tribes